Home Free was an American television reality competition series that premiered on the Fox network on July 22, 2015. It featured couples competing to win a dream home. The series is hosted by Mike Holmes and Co hosted by His Son Mike Holmes Jr. The first season has 8 episodes. On March 21, 2016 it was announced that the series would return for a second season on Thursday, June 16 with a new twist and new co-host Tim Tebow.

Home Free did not return for 2017-2018 TV season, leaving it cancelled after two seasons.

Premise
Season 1 opening Introduction: (narrated by Mike Holmes) 

Season 2 opening Introduction: (narrated by Tim Tebow)

Judging
For Season 1:
Each episode, home improvement and real estate experts will judge the final renovations of the homes. The couples will break down into two teams (Green Team and Gold Team). At the end of each build, the two teams will be judged on three of Mike's criteria: Quality, Creativity and Teamwork.

Experts:
John Gidding, Architect and Interior Designer, host of Curb Appeal
Danisha Danielle Hoston, Real Estate Broker and Investor

Season 2:
At the end of each week, team members who received a red tag during work orders have to compete. The person who fails the competition will be cut from the show and their hero wins that week's house. Leaders who have the gold tag, the person who won the first competition, can either save someone or send someone to the competition.

Competitors

Season 1
Kathy / Brian – Housekeeper / Landscaper – dating for 6 years
Heather / Ricky – Furniture Restorer / Firefighter – married with 2 children
Jamaal / Sheena – Brooklyn Teachers – newlyweds
Josh / Lauren – Design School Grads – engaged
Tiffany / Oreonna – Mothers / Athlete – married with 1 child
Kate / Andi – Fashion Designers – twin sisters competing for parents
Susie / Victor – Designer-Stylist / Material Science Engineer – dating for 2 years
Aidah / Siddiq – Jewelry Designer / Film Maker and Motion Graphic Artist – married with 2 children
Ben / Kasey – Carpenter / Mother – married 13 years with 4 children

Season 2
Valerie – Student – playing for community leaders, David and Angela of HoPe (Hispanic Organization Promoting Success) who changed Stephen, her late brother's life
Patrick – School Principal and Farmer – playing for an inspirational teacher Dennis Toliver
Nick – War Veteran – playing for his hero, U.S. Air Force officer Garrett Knight, who saved his life
Morgan – Business School Grad – playing for her mother, Stephaine, who fought to give her an education
Maggie – Real Estate Agent, Owner of a Home Improvement Company, and Aspiring FBI Agent – playing for her older brother, Brian, who raised her when their father left
Kevin – Police Officer – playing for his mother-in-law, Pat Weaver, who helped him through cancer
James – Landscaper, Pastor – playing for his mother, Betty and step father, Virlyn, who lost everything they had
Carre – Architect – playing for her best friend, Babette, a single mom who was diagnosed with cancer and beat it
Brian – Public Relations Rep – playing for his father's kidney donor, Jennifer Wolfe, a stranger who donated her kidney
Ben – Owner of a Clown Company – playing for his parents, Darryl and Cindy, Christian missionaries who help others through Hope City and are on the verge of losing their own home
Lucy – Co-owner of a Jewelry Company, Chef, and Plus Size Model – playing for her mentor, Mrs. Turner, her teacher who believed in her and helped kids in the Atlanta community

Season 1 Results

A bold lettering indicates the couple who was on the winning team, either Green Team  or Gold Team 
"Out" = out of competition and "Safe" = couples remain in competition and are safe from elimination

Note: Episode 7 and 8, since there weren't enough competitors per team, each couple designated their own team color: Ben/Kasey - Blue  Tiffany/Oreonna - Gray  Kate/Andi - Pink

Season 2 Results

A bold lettering indicates the contestant was on the winning team during the Drill Down Challenge, either Orange Team  or Yellow Team 
"Out" = out of competition and "Safe" = contestant remains in competition and are safe from elimination

Carre was moved to the Yellow Team in season 2 episode 3
Ben was moved to the Yellow Team in season 2 episode 6

Note: At the end of episode 6, since there weren't enough competitors per team, each contestant was designated their own individual color: Ben - Purple  Maggie - Yellow  Valerie - Pink  Nick - Brown  Patrick - Blue  James - Black

Series overview

Episodes

Season 1 (2015)

Season 2 (2016)

See also
 Home to Win, HGTV Canada's analogous TV series
 HGTV Dream Home (HGTV USA)

References

External links
 Official Site on Fox 

2010s American reality television series
2015 American television series debuts
2016 American television series endings
English-language television shows
Home renovation television series
Fox Broadcasting Company original programming
The Holmes Group